The National Sailing Hall of Fame is a nonprofit educational organization that promotes sailing and racing by recognizing individuals who have contributed to the sport, highlighting sailing's contribution to the American culture; and demonstrating its value as a hands-on tool for teaching math and science. The organization was established in 2005.

Museum
The National Sailing Hall of Fame was originally housed in the Captain Burtis House, located on the City Dock in Annapolis, Maryland.  Visitors to the site could participate in on-the-water experiences and learn about sailing history, art and lore.

On 1 May 2019, it was announced that the National Sailing Hall of Fame would move from Annapolis to Newport, Rhode Island.  

In 2019, the National Sailing Hall of Fame purchased the Armory Building in Newport, an historic building with connections to the America's Cup race. The space is being developed into exhibit space, in collaboration with the Herreshoff Museum and the America's Cup Hall of Fame. The new museum open May 10 2022, and is called the Sailing Museum.

Governance
Gus Carlson became president of the board of directors in 2019, succeeding Gary Jobson.  Effective April 15, 2019, Heather Ruhsam became the organization's executive director, where she also serves as the executive director of the upcoming Sailing Museum.

Honorary Advisory Board

Betsy Alison
Harry Anderson
Ed Baird
Janet Baxter 
Bill Buchan 
John Burnham 
Malin Burnham 
Frank Butler
Paul Cayard 
Stephen Colbert
Steve Colgate
Dave Curtis 
Mason Chrisman 
Dennis Conner
Bruce Farr 
J.J. Fetter 
Paul Foerster 
Gilbert M. Grosvenor 
Olaf Harken 
Peter Harken 
Sally Helme 
Halsey C. Herreshoff 
Stan Honey 
Terry Hutchinson 
Bob Johnstone 
Rod Johnstone 
Bruce Kirby 
William I. Koch 
John Kostecki 
Timmy Larr 
Geoff Mason 
Buddy Melges 
Lowell North 
Bill Pinkney 
Ken Read 
Mark Reynolds 
Dawn Riley 
John Rousmaniere
Frank Savage
Ted Turner 
Dave Ullman

Inductions
The National Sailing Hall of Fame began inducting honorees in 2011. As of June 2020, 88 individuals have been elected to the Hall of Fame.

Nominations to the National Sailing Hall of Fame are made online. A nominating committee evaluates all the submitted nominations. Inductees are typically announced in the summer, and the induction ceremony is held in the fall at different locations around the United States. Inductions began in 2011. The 2020 induction ceremony was held virtually in September 2020, due to the coronavirus pandemic.

Class of 2011
Note: Inaugural Year
Buddy Melges
Hobie Alter
Betsy Alison
Harold Vanderbilt
Paul Cayard
Dennis Conner
Nathanael Herreshoff
Ted Hood
Gary Jobson
Bus Mosbacher, Jr.
Lowell North
Joshua Slocum
Olin Stephens
Ted Turner
Charlie Barr

Class of 2012
Peter Barrett
Bob Bavier, Jr.
F. Gregg Bemis
Stan Honey
Bruce Kirby
John Kostecki
Mark Reynolds
Roderick Stephens Jr.
John Cox Stevens

Class of 2013
John Alden
Tom Blackaller, Jr.
Bill Buchan
William Starling Burgess
Frank Butler
Runnie Colie, Jr.
Dave Curtis
Timothea Larr
Morris Rosenfeld
Stuart H Walker

Class of 2014
Harry Anderson, Jr.
Nathaniel Bowditch
Carl Eichenlaub, Jr.
Olaf Harken
Peter Harken
Lewis Francis Herreshoff
Jim Kilroy
George O'Day

Class of 2015
Steve Colgate
JJ Fetter
Paul Foerster
Jan Gougeon
Meade Gougeon
Sam Merrick

Class of 2016
Ed Baird
Malin Burnham
Bill Ficker
Harriet Electa "Exy" Johnson
Irving Johnson
Bob Johnstone III
Rod Johnstone
Tom Perkins
Dave Ullman

Class of 2017
Bill Bentsen
Ray Hunt
Bill Martin
Clarkie Mills
Robby Naish
Corny Shields
Randy Smyth
Tom Whidden II

Class of 2018
John Scott Biddle
Vincent D'avila Melo "Vince" Brun
George Stravos Coumantaros
William Ingraham "Bill" Koch
James Martinus "Ding" Schoonmaker
William Henry Webb

Class of 2019 
 Captain John Bonds
 Thomas F. Day
 Robbie Doyle
 Buddy Friedrichs
 Allison Jolly
 Donald McKay
 Everett A. Pearson
 Doug Peterson
 Herbert Lawrence Stone

Class of 2020 
 James E. Buttersworth
 Gordon Douglass
 Robbie Haines Jr.
 Bill Mattison
 Dave Perry
 John Rousmaniere
 Diane and Hoyle Schweitzer

Class of 2021 
 Alexander “Red” Bryan and Cortlandt “Bud” Heyniger
 William Carl Buchan 
 Augie Diaz 
 Gilbert Gray
 Lynne Jewell 
 Stephen Luce 
 Jane Wiswell Pegel 
 Dawn Riley
 Richard “Dick” Rose

Lifetime Achievement Award recipients 
2019: Arthur Knapp, Jr.

2020: Briggs Cunningham, Jr.

Affiliations
US Sailing

Partnerships
U.S. Naval Academy
Gowrie Group

References

External links
National Sailing Hall of Fame official website

Sports museums in Rhode Island
Sailing
Sailing
Museums in Annapolis, Maryland
Non-profit organizations based in Rhode Island
501(c)(3) organizations
Sailing museums and halls of fame
Sailing in the United States
Sports museums in Maryland